The Canton of Bacqueville-en-Caux is a former canton situated in the Seine-Maritime département and in the Haute-Normandie region of northern France. It was disbanded following the French canton reorganisation which came into effect in March 2015. It consisted of 25 communes, which joined the new canton of Luneray in 2015. It had a total of 11,466 inhabitants (2012).

Geography 
A farming area in the arrondissement of Dieppe, centred on the town of Bacqueville-en-Caux. The altitude varies from 11m (Avremesnil) to 146m (Auzouville-sur-Saâne with an average altitude of 83m.

The canton comprised 25 communes:

Auppegard
Auzouville-sur-Saâne
Avremesnil
Bacqueville-en-Caux
Biville-la-Rivière
Brachy
Gonnetot
Greuville
Gruchet-Saint-Siméon
Gueures
Hermanville
Lamberville
Lammerville
Lestanville
Luneray
Omonville
Rainfreville
Royville
Saâne-Saint-Just
Saint-Mards
Saint-Ouen-le-Mauger
Sassetot-le-Malgardé
Thil-Manneville
Tocqueville-en-Caux
Vénestanville

Population

See also 
 Arrondissements of the Seine-Maritime department
 Cantons of the Seine-Maritime department
 Communes of the Seine-Maritime department

References

Bacqueville-en-Caux
2015 disestablishments in France
States and territories disestablished in 2015